Andreiașu de Jos is a commune located in Vrancea County, Muntenia, Romania. It is composed of seven villages: Andreiașu de Jos, Andreiașu de Sus, Arșița, Fetig, Hotaru, Răchitașu, and Titila.

The commune is located in a hilly area, at the foot of the Curvature Carpathians, on the left bank of the Milcov River, the traditional boundary between Wallachia and Moldavia.

References

Communes in Vrancea County
Localities in Muntenia